Niagara was a federal electoral district in the Canadian province of Ontario, which was represented in the House of Commons of Canada from 1867 to 1883. It is sometimes also considered one of Ontario's historic counties, as it was listed in some post-Confederation census records as a county of residence.

Niagara consisted of the Lincoln County townships of Niagara and Grantham, including the towns of Niagara-on-the-Lake and St. Catharines.

The electoral district was abolished in 1882 when it was merged into Lincoln and Niagara riding.

Members of Parliament

This riding elected the following members of the House of Commons of Canada:

Angus Morrison, Conservative - 1867-1874
Josiah Burr Plumb (first term), Conservative - 1874-1878
Patrick Hughes, Liberal - 1878-1879
Josiah Plumb (second term), Conservative - 1879-1882

Electoral history

|}

|}

|}

On election being declared void:
 

|}

|}

On election being declared void:

|}

Mr. Hughes was disqualified; subsequently the Court struck off four votes from Mr. Hughes' list for bribery, thus giving the seat to Mr. Plumb by a majority of two.

External links
Library of Parliament website

Former counties in Ontario
Former federal electoral districts of Ontario